Plecoptera oculata is a species of moth of the family Erebidae first described by Frederic Moore in 1882. It is found in India.

References

Moths of Asia
Anobinae